Eleven is the eleventh studio album by American country music singer Martina McBride, released on October 11, 2011, through Republic Nashville. The title of the album was inspired by the fact that it is McBride's eleventh album, it has eleven tracks and its release date. A deluxe edition of the album was also made available exclusively at Target stores. It featured slightly different cover art, with a blue fade at the bottom instead of white, and included four bonus tracks, as well as music videos for "Teenage Daughters" and "I'm Gonna Love You Through It". As of March 2012 the album has sold over 150,000 copies in the US. On July 3, 2012 the four Deluxe Bonus Tracks were released on iTunes as individual singles.

Track listing

Personnel 
 Martina McBride – lead vocals, backing vocals
 Byron Gallimore – synthesizers
 Chuck Leavell – acoustic piano, Wurlitzer electric piano, Hammond B3 organ
 Mike Rojas – acoustic piano, Wurlitzer electric piano, Hammond B3 organ
 Gordon Mote – acoustic piano, Hammond B3 organ
 Jamie Muhoberac – synthesizers
 Tom Bukovac – acoustic guitar, electric guitar
 Dan Dugmore – acoustic guitar, electric guitar, steel guitar
 Dann Huff – electric guitar
 Michael Landau – electric guitar
 Brent Mason – electric guitar
 David A. Stewart – electric guitar
 Ilya Toshinsky – acoustic guitar, electric guitar, bouzouki, mandolin
 Paul Bushnell – bass
 Michael Rhodes – bass
 Craig Young – bass 
 Matt Chamberlain – drums
 Shannon Forrest – drums, drum programming, percussion 
 David Huff  – drum programming
 Frank Macek – drum programming
 Ava McBride – foot tapping (11)
 Stuart Duncan – fiddle
 Jim Horn – baritone saxophone, horn arrangements
 Jeff Coffin – tenor saxophone
 Charles Rose – trombone
 Scott Ducaj – trumpet
 John Catchings – cello
 Kristin Wilkinson – viola, string arrangements 
 David Angell – violin
 David Davidson – violin
 The Nashville String Machine – strings (3, 9)
 David Campbell – string arrangements and conductor (3, 9)
 Perry Coleman – backing vocals
 Jimi Westbrook – harmony vocals (2)
 Pat Monahan – lead vocals (4)
 Carolyn Dawn Johnson – backing vocals (5)
 Phillip Sweet – harmony vocals (7)

Production 
 Bryan Gallimore – producer, mixing (2)
 Martina McBride – producer, liner notes 
 Dann Huff – producer (7)
 Allison Jones – A&R  
 Scott McBride – recording, mixing (4-11)
 Allen Ditto – additional recording, recording assistant, mix assistant (4-11)
 Erik Lutkins – additional recording, mix assistant (2)
 Justin Niebank – mixing (1, 3)
 Seth Morton – mix assistant (1, 3)
 Stephen Allbritten – mix assistant (2)
 Adam Ayan – mastering at Gateway Mastering (Portland, Maine)
 Shea Fowler – A&R production assistant 
 Whitney Sutton – copy coordinator
 Sandi Spika Borchetta – art direction 
 Lee Ann Ramey – graphic design 
 Randee St. Nicholas – photography
 Claudia Fowler – wardrobe stylist 
 Robert Steinken – hair stylist 
 Collier Strong – make-up
 Bruce Allen – management

Chart performance

Weekly charts

Year-end charts

Singles

Tour dates

References

External links

2011 albums
Martina McBride albums
Albums produced by Byron Gallimore
Republic Records albums